is the common name for a number of species of plant. It may refer to:

Myrciaria ibarrae
Psidium galapageium
Psidium guineense
Psidium sartorianum
Quararibea asterolepis